Hořiněves is a municipality and village in Hradec Králové District in the Hradec Králové Region of the Czech Republic. It has about 700 inhabitants.

Administrative parts
Villages of Jeřičky, Želkovice and Žíželeves are administrative parts of Hořiněves.

Geography
It lies in an agricultural landscape of the East Elbe Table.

History

The first written mention of Hořiněves is from 1238.

Sights
The main sight of Hořiněves is the Hořiněves Castle. It was created by complete reconstruction of an old aristocratic residence in 1661, then it was rebuilt in the Baroque style in 1674–1676.

The baroque Church of Saint Procopius was built in 1707. It was built on the site of a Gothic church from 1384, which was destroyed by the Hussites in 1425. In the village of Žíželeves there is also the late baroque Church of Saint Nicholas from 1769–1776.

The birth house of Václav Hanka, who is the most famous local native, is now a museum.

Notable people
Václav Hanka (1791–1861), philologist
Josef Prokop Pražák (1870–1904), ornithologist

References

External links

 

Villages in Hradec Králové District